Johnson Township is the name of eight townships in the U.S. state of Indiana:

 Johnson Township, Clinton County, Indiana
 Johnson Township, Crawford County, Indiana
 Johnson Township, Gibson County, Indiana
 Johnson Township, Knox County, Indiana
 Johnson Township, LaGrange County, Indiana
 Johnson Township, LaPorte County, Indiana
 Johnson Township, Ripley County, Indiana
 Johnson Township, Scott County, Indiana

Indiana township disambiguation pages